The Bajuni Islands (also known as the Bajun Islands or Baajun Islands) are an archipelago in southern Somalia. They are situated in the Somali sea off the southern coast of Jubaland, from Kismayo to Ras Kiyamboni.

Geography
Administratively, the islands are within the Lower Juba region of Somalia.

There are six main islands:
 Chandra (2.95 km²),
 Chovaye (also spelled Tovai) (5.46 km²),
 Chula (also spelled Tula) (1.99 km²),
 Koyama (6.38 km²),
 Darakasi (1.99 km²) and
 Ngumi (2.56 km²).
Chula, where the village of Ndowa is situated, is the only island with a significant population

In addition, there are several smaller islands, including Kandha Iwu, Fuma, and Ilisi. The island of Kismayo was attached to the coast in 1961 during the construction of Kismayo Port.

History
The islands were part of British East Africa prior to World War I. The Bajuni Islands formed a constituent part of British Jubaland. In 1924, mainland Jubaland was ceded to Italy, while the Bajuni Islands were transferred two years later.

According to C. Wightwick Haywood, a British official in Kismayo who visited the islands in 1913, the only inhabited islands in the chain were Chovaye and Chula. Maize, millet, sweet potatoes and coconuts were grown on the islands, and dhows were used for transportation. While there, Haywood saw ruins of what he described as a "fair-sized town" on Chovaye. He mentioned that similar stone scrollwork could also be seen on houses in the Lamu Islands. Haywood thought some of the residents to be of Arab or Persian descent.

Demographics
The islands are today mainly inhabited by the eponymous Bajuni people.

See also
List of islands in the Indian Ocean
Saad ad-Din Islands

Notes 

Islands of Somalia
Archipelagoes of Somalia
Lower Juba